Ultimate Body Blows is a 1994 Amiga CD32 and DOS fighting game. It is largely an amalgamation of Body Blows and Body Blows Galactic released in 1993 by Team17, featuring all the characters and most of the stages from both games, but using the HUD and menu interface of the first game. In this respect, the game is comparable to Midway's Mortal Kombat Trilogy, although the gameplay and several of the characters are closer to Capcom's Street Fighter series.

References

External links
Ultimate Body Blows at MobyGames
Ultimate Body Blows at the Hall of Light
Ultimate Body Blows on Amiga Reviews.dead link

1994 video games
Amiga CD32 games
DOS games
Team17 games
Fighting games
Video games developed in the United Kingdom
Video games scored by Allister Brimble
Games commercially released with DOSBox
Windows games